KBC may refer to:

Broadcasting
 KBC (TV channel), Algeria
 Kenya Broadcasting Corporation
 Kwangju Broadcasting Corporation, South Korea
 Kyushu Asahi Broadcasting, a Japanese station referred to as KBC

Companies
 KBC Advanced Technologies, an energy and process industry consulting company
 KBC Bank, Belgian bank and insurance company
 Kerrville Bus Company, a subsidiary of Coach USA

Colleges
 Kachemak Bay Campus, a campus of Kenai Peninsula College, a unit of the University of Alaska Anchorage
 Kingsbrook College, one of the two schools that merged to become Elizabeth Woodville School
 Kingston Bible College, Kingston, Nova Scotia, Canada

Other
 KBC Band, formed in 1986 by former members of the band Jefferson Airplane
 The KBC, an indie and disco house band from Preston, Lancashire
 Kaun Banega Crorepati, Indian game show based on Who Wants to Be a Millionaire?
 Karachi Boat Club, Karachi, Sindh, Pakistan
 Kinbrace railway station, National Rail code KBC
 Kuki Baptist Convention in northeast India
 KBC Void, an astronomical phenomenon